Jeffrey J. Byrd is one of the contributing writers for The Complete Idiot's Guide to Microbiology. He was a commissioner for the Middle States Commission on Higher Education and is the editor-in-chief of the Journal of Microbiology and Biology Education, formerly called Microbiology Education and published by the American Society for Microbiology. He is a professor of Biology at St. Mary's College of Maryland.

References

Year of birth missing (living people)
Living people
St. Mary's College of Maryland faculty